The Oman Australia Cable (OAC) is a 9,800 km fibre-optic submarine communications cable that entered service in September 2022, linking Oman and Australia via the Cocos (Keeling) Islands. OAC is owned and operated by SUBCO, with Omantel as the landing partner in Oman, and Equinix providing the landing stations in Perth and Muscat. 

The cable consists of three fibre pairs and has a total design capacity of 45 terabits per second. It has been interconnected with the INDIGO Central and INDIGO West optical fibre cables at the Australian landing site in Perth. SUBCO and Omantel are expected to extend the reach of the cable with connections from Muscat to London, Milan and Marseille.

The cable is notable for providing a diverse international route from Perth, and a lower-latency path between Australia and Europe, the Middle East and Africa. Competing cables such as the Australia Singapore Cable, INDIGO West and SEA-ME-WE 3 all traverse a similar path via the Sunda Strait to Singapore, whereas OAC traverses the Indian Ocean to the south-western coast of Asia.

During the laying of the cable, Twitter users monitoring the progress of the installation using Automatic identification system-based tracking services observed the cable ship CS Dependable loitering in the waters surrounding Diego Garcia, indicating that an undisclosed branching unit and spur may have been installed to provide connectivity to the atoll.

Landing points
Perth, Western Australia, Australia
Cocos (Keeling) Islands
Muscat, Oman

See also
 Other Australian international submarine cables (and year of first service):
 INDIGO West (2019)
 Australia Singapore Cable (2018)
 Hawaiki Cable (2018)
 Pipe Pacific Cable (2009)
 Telstra Endeavour (2008)
 Australia–Japan Cable (2001)
 Southern Cross Cable (2000)
 SEA-ME-WE 3 (2000, Australian portion in service earlier)
 JASURAUS (1997)
 PacRimWest (1995)

References

Submarine communications cables in the Indian Ocean
2022 establishments in Australia